USS Joseph Strauss (DDG-16), named for Admiral Joseph Strauss USN (1861–1948), was a  guided missile destroyer of the United States Navy.

Joseph Strausss keel was laid down by the New York Shipbuilding Corporation at Camden in New Jersey on 27 December 1960. The vessel was launched on 9 December 1961 by Mrs. Lawrence Haines Coburn, granddaughter of Admiral Joseph Strauss and commissioned on 20 April 1963.

During the Vietnam War Joseph Strauss served as plane guard for aircraft carriers on Yankee Station in the Tonkin Gulf, participated in Sea Dragon operations, patrolled on search and rescue duties and carried out naval gunfire support missions.

Operational history

1960s

Joseph Strauss departed Philadelphia on 6 June 1963 for a brief cruise to Puerto Rico and Willemstad, Curaçao, and then transited the Panama Canal to join the Pacific Fleet on the western seaboard. She arrived at Long Beach Naval Shipyard on 13 July 1963 for alterations, followed by tactics out of San Diego north to Seattle, Washington.

As flagship of Destroyer Squadron 3, Joseph Strauss sailed from Long Beach on 30 June 1964. After calling at Pearl Harbor and Midway Atoll, she arrived in Yokosuka, Japan on 18 July. While in port at Yokosuka, the crew of Joseph Strauss learned that North Vietnamese torpedo boats had attacked the U.S. destroyer  in the Tonkin Gulf, and the ship hurried out of port with other squadron ships to join carrier forces in the South China Sea. She departed 3 August 1964 to rendezvous off Okinawa on 6 August with the aircraft carrier . During this time, U.S. Naval aircraft from Constellation conducted air strikes over North Vietnam. Brief sweeps were made to the Philippines and ports of Japan. Joseph Strauss arrived in Yokosuka on 15 December 1964 for upkeep, sailing again on 21 January 1965 to support U.S. Forces in Vietnam until 1 March.

Following upkeep in Subic Bay from 1–10 March, Joseph Strauss sailed with ships of the Royal Thai Navy for exercises in the Gulf of Thailand. She was briefly flagship of the 7th Fleet from 22 to 26 March during the official visit of Vice Admiral Paul B. Blackburn, Jr., to Bangkok, Thailand. She departed Yokosuka on 19 April for operations that brought recognition and honor to both the ship and her crew.

From 16 through 21 May, she observed operations of a Russian task unit. She returned to Yokosuka from 23 May to 4 June, then again sailed for the Gulf of Tonkin. Her ensuing 27 days as flagship of the SAR/AAW picket unit were highly successful, establishing operational procedures and capabilities which remain destroyer standards. Three days later, two propeller-driven Skyraiders, also from Midway and under Joseph Strauss advisory air control shot down another MiG-17. As a result, members of Strauss Combat Information Center team were decorated by the Secretary of the Navy.

Joseph Strauss arrived in Hong Kong on 6 July 1965, putting out to sea 14 to 16 July to avoid Typhoon Freda, and again 18 to 19 July to carry the 7th Fleet Salvage Officer to Pratus Reef to assist in refloating . She departed Hong Kong 21 July for Yokosuka. The following day she took a disabled Nationalist Chinese fishing boat in tow and delivered it safely to Keelung on 23 July, thence sailed to Yokosuka, arriving 25 July for upkeep.

On 3 September 1965, she successfully fired two improved Tartar missiles off Okinawa. She then returned to Subic Bay for naval gunfire support training which continued off Da Nang, South Vietnam. On 28 October 1965, she fired her first shots in anger, expending 217 5-inch shells in support of a combined ARVN-Marine Corps search-and-destroy operation against the Viet Cong. Joseph Strauss thus became the first U.S. Navy guided missile destroyer to fire her guns at enemy targets. As a result of this action, the ship's crew received a commendation from the Commanding General, 2nd U.S. Marine Division. She returned to Yokosuka on 7 December 1965 for upkeep and preparations to resume operations off South Vietnam. Joseph Strauss returned to the Gulf of Tonkin 10 February 1966 and remained active in the war zone until heading for Hong Kong exactly one month later. Back in the fighting 26 April, she remained in the war zone until returning to Yokosuka 15 June. That day her home port was changed to Pearl Harbor which she reached 26 July.

Joseph Strauss operated in the Hawaiian area until heading back for the Western Pacific 14 January 1967. She remained in the Far East until returning to Pearl Harbor on 17 June.

Operation Praying Mantis

On 14 April 1988, the frigate  sighted three mines floating approximately one-half mile from the ship. Twenty minutes after the first sighting, as Samuel B. Roberts was backing clear of the minefield, she struck a submerged mine nearly ripping the warship in half. The crew stabilized the ship. Samuel B. Roberts was sent back to the United States for repair.

On 18 April 1988, Operation Praying Mantis took place which was an attack by U.S. Naval forces in retaliation for the Iranian mining of the Persian Gulf and damage to an American ship Samuel B. Roberts. The battle, the largest for American surface forces since World War II, sank two Iranian warships and it also marked the first surface-to-surface missile engagement in U.S. Navy history. The Americans attacked with several groups of surface warships, plus aircraft.

In the middle of the action, Joshan, an Iranian Kaman-class fast attack craft, challenged the cruiser  and Surface Action Group Charlie, firing a Harpoon missile at them. The frigate  responded to the challenge by firing four Standard missiles, while Wainwright followed with two Standard missiles. The attacks destroyed the Iranian ship's superstructure but did not immediately sink it. The three ships of SAG Charlie (Wainwright, Simpson, and ) closed on Joshan, destroying the Iranian vessel with naval gunfire. Fighting continued when the  departed Bandar Abbas and challenged elements of an American surface group. The frigate was spotted by two VA-95 A-6Es while they were flying surface combat air patrol for Joseph Strauss. Sahand fired missiles at the A-6Es, and the Intruders replied with two Harpoons and four laser-guided Skipper bombs. Joseph Strauss added a Harpoon missile. Most, if not all, of the U.S. weapons hit the Iranian ship. Fires blazing on Sahands decks eventually reached her magazines, causing an explosion that helped sink the ship. Despite the loss of Sahand, one of Iran's most modern ships, the Iranian navy continued to fight. Late in the day, a sister ship of Sahand, departed from its berth and fired a surface-to-air missile at several A-6Es from VA-95. Intruder pilot Engler dropped a laser-guided bomb on Sabalan, leaving the ship dead in the water. The Iranian frigate, stern partially submerged, was taken in tow by an Iranian tugboat.

Greek service and decommissioning
Joseph Strauss was decommissioned on 1 February 1990, transferred to Greece on 1 October 1992 and renamed Formion (D220), for the Athenian Admiral Phormio, and stricken from the Naval Vessel Register on 11 January 1995.

Greece decommissioned Formion on 29 July 2002 and the ship was sold as scrap on 19 February 2004.

References

External links

 USS Joseph Strauss DDG-16 at MaritimeQuest.com
 

Charles F. Adams-class destroyers
Ships built by New York Shipbuilding Corporation
1961 ships
Cold War destroyers of the United States
Vietnam War destroyers of the United States
Kimon-class destroyers